The 2017 MSA British Rally Championship was the 58th season of the British Rally Championship. It featuredure eight classes:

 BRC 1 (R5, R4, Super 2000, Regional Rally Car)
 BRC Production Cup (N4)
 BRC 3 (R3)
 BRC 4 (R2)
 National Rally Cup (open class)
 Junior BRC (R2, drivers under 26 years old)
 Cadet Cup (R2, drivers under 25 years old)
 Ladies BRC Trophy

Calendar

The 2017 championship was contested over seven rounds  For the first time, Ypres Rally, a Belgian event, was featured on the calendar.

Seven events were held on tarmac and gravel surfaces:

Team and Drivers
BRC1 Entries

BRC Production Cup Entries

BRC4 Entries

Junior BRC Entries

Cadet Cup Entries

Ladies BRC Trophy Entries

Calendar changes
On 07 January, the British Rally Championship management team announced via a press release that the 2017 Mid Wales Stages Rally, usually the opening round of the championship and held in March, would not take place. The reason cited was that a deal had been reached with Natural Resources Wales - the agency that runs Welsh government forests - over the fees payable to run a forest rally in Wales however a misunderstanding over the VAT payable meant that it would be unfeasible to run the 2017 event. The Border Counties Rally, based in Jedburgh and also round two of the Scottish Rally Championship was announced as a replacement event and the 2017 series opener.

Event results

Podium places and information on each event.

Drivers championship standings

Points are awarded in each class as follows: 25, 18, 15, 12, 10, 8, 6, 4, 2, 1. Competitors may nominate one event as their 'joker', on which they will score additional points: 5, 4, 3, 2, 1.
Competitors six best scores will count towards their championship total, including the final round. The final round of the championship will be a double-header for points as the rally is split into two point scoring rounds.

References

British Rally Championship seasons
Rally Championship
British Rally Championship